Erythrolamprus ocellatus, commonly known as the Tobago false coral snake, red snake, or doctor snake is a species of colubrid snake, which is endemic to the island of Tobago (in the Republic of Trinidad and Tobago).

Description
Unlike other Erythrolamprus species, E. ocellatus is not sympatric with coral snakes and has a spotted rather than a banded pattern.

Dorsally, it is reddish (with black scale tips), and has a series of about 25 large ocelli (round black spots with light centers) running down the middle of the back. This is considered to bean imperfect mimic of a coral snake (there are no extant species of coral snakes in Tobago.) The dorsal surfaces of the head and neck are black, and the tail is ringed with black.

Geographic Range, Habitat and Activity
The species is a Tobago endemic, known only from the wetter northeastern and central parts of the island. It utilizes leaf-litter and is perhaps also fossorial in rainforest, forest edge and cacao plantation habitats. It seems to be most active in the early morning and late afternoon.

Diet
It probably feeds on other snakes. They also feed on the microteiid lizards in the genus Bachia, the rain frog Pristimantis urichi, the túngara frog (also known as Central American mud-puddle frog) Engystomops pustulosus, and the gecko Gonatodes vittatus (in captivity), and unidentified fish.

References

Further reading
Emsley, M.G. 1966. The Status of the Snake Erythrolamprus ocellatus Peters. Copeia 1966 (1): 128–129.
Murphy, John C. 1997. Amphibians and Reptiles of Trinidad and Tobago. Krieger. Malabar, Florida. 245 pp. .
Peters, W. 1868. Über neue Säugethiere (Colobus, Rhinolophus, Vesperus) und neue oder weniger bekannte Amphibien (Hemidactylus, Herpetodryas, Spilotes, Elaphis, Lamprophis, Erythrolamprus). Monatsberichte der Königlich-Preussischen Akademie der Wissenschaften zu Berlin 1868: 637–642. ("Erythrolamprus ocellatus n. sp.", p. 642.)

ocellatus
Reptiles of Trinidad and Tobago
Endemic fauna of Trinidad and Tobago
Reptiles described in 1868
Taxa named by Wilhelm Peters